
The Bidasoa is a river in the Basque Country of northern Spain and southern France that runs largely south to north. Named as such downstream of the village of Oronoz-Mugairi (municipality of Baztan) in the province of Navarre, the river actually results from the merger of several streams near the village Erratzu, with the stream Baztan that rises at the north-eastern side of the mount Autza (1,306 m) being considered the source of the Bidasoa. It joins the Cantabrian Sea (Bay of Biscay) between the towns of Hendaye and Hondarribia.

The river is best known for establishing the borderline at its lower tract. This stretch is crossed not only by aircraft at low height but by important European communication axes, namely AP8 E5 E80 - E70 A63 (motorway, connection at the Biriatu toll), main roads N1 - N10 (connection at the roundabout of Saizar by the river) and major French and Spanish railway networks,—RENFE and SNCF. Besides these major lines, other regional ones cross it too, e.g. regional railway EuskoTren (terminus in Hendaye) and another double bridge (pedestrians/vehicles) joining the towns on the border, i.e. the historical Santiago Bridge (Way of St. James). At this stage of the river, urban landscape prevails (built-up area).

The banks of Hondarribia hold the minor San Sebastian Airport serving domestic flights and currently mired in controversy over its lengthening and upgrading scheme.

Pronunciation and etymology
Linguistic and historic research point to the name stemming from Latin phrase "Via ad Oiassonem" (later corrupting into Basque "Bidasoa") on account of the road that linked at Roman times Basque town Pompaelo with Oiasso, which may have run along the river.

Course of the river and tributaries

The Bidasoa flows through much of its  length over Navarrese territory, except for the last , where it establishes the borderline between France and Spain, as well as the boundary between the Basque provinces of Gipuzkoa and Labourd. In line with the distribution of the river's length, the bulk of its watershed's area lies on Navarre. The basin holds 105 permanent streams and rivers that number , the region being drenched in rains regularly. The Navarrese side of the basin (rural landscape) is inhabited by 22,000 inhabitants. 70% of its population have the sewage treated before spilling to the river.

But for the first 15-odd kilometres, the river clings to the north to south disposition of other neighbouring rivers of Gipuzkoa joining the Bay of Biscay, e.g. Urumea, Oria, etc. Strengthened by the waters harvested from the sides of the pass of Belate, downstream of Doneztebe the river heads north and crosses the town of Bera at the north end of Navarre before entering Gipuzkoa at Endarlatsa. From the town of Doneztebe on, the main road N-121 runs along till the roundabout across the river from the toll of Biriatu by the AP-8 (motorway). Next comes the quarter Behobia and the major towns on the shores of the estuary.

The main tributaries of the Bidasoa are the minor rivers Zeberia (length ), Ezkurra, Latsa and Endara. Additionally, further small rivers and streams feed the Bidasoa all along.

Fishing and environmental challenges

The Navarrese tract of the river is a preferred destination for fishing enthusiasts, the river being home to several native fish species, namely eel (Anguilla anguilla), salmon (Salmo palar), trout (Salmo trutta), bullhead (Cottus gobio), Barbatula barbatula, Phoxinus phoxinus, gudgeon (Gobio lozanoi), sea lamprey (Petromyzon marinus), allis shad (Alosa alosa), flounder (Platichthys flesus) and grey mullet (Chelon labrosus), some of them declared endangered species and highly interesting (especially bullhead and salmon). Moreover, a species of the Ebro, Chondrostoma miegii, has been introduced in the last 30–40 years on the lower tract of the Bidasoa, thereafter extending gradually upstream.

As a result, overfishing has become a major problem for the river's fauna, with special pressure put on salmon migrating upstream to spawn. They do not make it to their goal and die before spawning, either falling prey to fishers' bait or an inability to overcome hydroelectric power stations (128 over all the course) and the 114 related dams, since 63% of them prevent migratory fish from achieving their purpose. Schemes by the Regional Government of Navarre are underway with a view to handling the issue.

See also 
 List of rivers of Spain
 Battle of the Bidassoa (1813)
 Bidasoa-Txingudi
 Pheasant Island (Île des Faisans)

Footnotes

References
Report on the Environmental State of the Bidasoa by the Basque Regional Govt (site in Spanish)
Report for Correction Measures on the Bidasoa (link to Pdf, site in Spanish)
Briefing on the Bidasoa by an Agency of the Navarrese Regional Govt (site in Spanish)
Bidasoa-Txingudi
Geographical descriptive account of the Lower Bidasoa region by Geological Research Agency (site in Basque)

Bidasoa
Rivers of Navarre
Rivers of the Basque Country (autonomous community)
 
International rivers of Europe
Gipuzkoa
France–Spain border
Rivers of Nouvelle-Aquitaine
Rivers of Pyrénées-Atlantiques
Rivers of Spain
Border rivers